Yugoslavia took part at the 1984 Eurovision Song Contest held in Luxembourg City, Luxembourg.

Before Eurovision

Jugovizija 1984 
The Yugoslavian national final to select their entry, Jugovizija 1984, was held on 23 March at the Universal Hall in Skopje, and was hosted by Blagoja Krstevski and Ljiljana Trajkovska.

Sixteen songs made it to the national final, which was broadcast by JRT to all of the regions of Yugoslavia. The winner was decided by the votes of eight regional juries (Novi Sad, Sarajevo, Pristina, Ljubljana, Skopje, Beograd, Zagreb and Titograd).

At Eurovision
"Ljubavna priča br. 1" was renamed to "Ciao, amore" on the night of the contest, where Yugoslavia performed 12th, following Netherlands and preceding Austria. At the close of voting, Yugoslavia received 26 points, placing 18th out of 19 entries, ahead of only Austria. The Yugoslav jury awarded its 12 points to Cyprus.

Voting

References

1984
Countries in the Eurovision Song Contest 1984
Eurovision